Amit Kandarp Shukla (born 2 January 1985 in Nairobi, Kenya) is a Kenyan cricketer. Shukla has represented the Kenya in List A cricket, and also the Kenya A cricket team. He was a part of the Southern Stars squad in the Sahara Elite League, and now is a part of the Kongonis team that takes part in the revamped structure in the East African tournaments (East Africa Premier League and East Africa Cup). A number of good performances more or less brought him a call-up, but it was mostly due to the mass exodus of senior players, a number of them after refusing central contracts offers to them by the board. It was the squad to face the UAE in the second round of the 2011–13 ICC Intercontinental Cup and the 2011–13 ICC Intercontinental Cup One-Day, with the latter being much significant as it served as qualification for the 2015 Cricket World Cup. He played just the one List A match against UAE, where he was not required to bat and conceded 17 runs off his three overs for no wicket. The opponent won the match by 4 wickets.

References

External links 
 ESPNCricinfo Profile
 CricketArchive Profile

1985 births
Living people
Cricketers from Nairobi
Kenyan cricketers